Toplița is a commune in Hunedoara County, Transylvania, Romania. It is composed of eight villages: Curpenii Silvașului, Dăbâca (Doboka), Dealu Mic (Párosza), Goleș (Golles), Hășdău (Hosdó), Mosoru (Moszor), Toplița and Vălari (Valár).

References

Communes in Hunedoara County
Localities in Transylvania